Takur Ghar is a high mountain located in the Arma Mountains of southeastern Afghanistan. The peak is on the eastern border of the Shah-i-Kot Valley.

The peak of Takur Ghar was the location of fierce fighting between US Special Operations Forces and al-Qaeda insurgents, as well as Taliban fighters, during Operation Anaconda in March 2002 as part of the larger US war in Afghanistan. 

Takur Ghar is featured in the 2010 video game Medal of Honor.

References

Mountains of Afghanistan
Landforms of Paktia Province